Coledale is a small sea-side village approximately  north of Wollongong along the Princes Highway in New South Wales, Australia. It is part of the City of Wollongong and lies between Wombarra and Austinmer.

Coledale has several shops on the main road as well as a RSL club, public hall, fire station, public hospital with an aged care unit. Coledale's shops include a newsagent (that triple times as cafe & gift store), a more comprehensive gift store (sister to the cafe), selling furniture and homeware items can be found diagonally opposite on the main road. There is also a beauty salon,  hair dresser and fish & chip shop.  Further along the road there is another cafe/restaurant (Cole Coast) and a bottle shop. Coledale also has a small public school with good views of Coledale beach.

Coledale also has a playing field for soccer, cricket and netball: St. James Park is the home ground for the Coledale Waves (formerly known as the Coledale Rosebuds) soccer teams. This was where Kerryn McCann often trained as she lived close by.

History

Population
In the 2016 Census, there were 1,260 people in Coledale. 82.1% of people were born in Australia and 91.8% of people spoke only English at home. The most common responses for religion were No Religion 39.5%, Catholic 20.6% and Anglican 18.1%.

Beaches
Coledale has two sandy beaches: Coledale Beach to the north of the village which is patrolled during summer and Sharkey's Beach to the south, a popular surfing spot. In the summer months Coledale Lifesaving Club runs Nippers every 2nd Sunday on Coledale Beach. Coledale's main patrolled beach is extremely popular with campers & caravaners, having simple but reliable amenities.

Transport
Coledale railway station is located halfway up Cater Street, off Lawrence Hargrave Drive. The station is operated by NSW TrainLink.

References

External links

An interactive 360° panorama of the main street

Suburbs of Wollongong